Sri Lanka is a tropical island situated close to the southern tip of India. The invertebrate fauna is as large as it is common to other regions of the world. There are about 2 million species of arthropods found in the world, and still it is counting. So many new species are discover up to this time also. So it is very complicated and difficult to summarize the exact number of species found within a certain region.

The following list provide the hard ticks currently identified in Sri Lanka.

Ticks
Ticks are small arachnids in the order Parasitiformes. Along with mites, they constitute the subclass Acari. Ticks are ectoparasites (external parasites), living by hematophagy on the blood of mammals, birds, and sometimes reptiles and amphibians. Ticks are vectors of a number of diseases that affect both humans and other animals.

Despite their poor reputation among human communities, ticks may play an ecological role by culling infirm animals and preventing overgrazing of plant resources.

The Ixodidae are a family of ticks containing the hard ticks. They are distinguished from the other main family of ticks, the soft ticks (Argasidae) by the presence of a scutum or hard shield. In both the nymph and the adult, a prominent capitulum (head) projects forwards from the animal's body; in the Argasidae, conversely, the capitulum is concealed beneath the body.

Of the 702 species in 14 genera, 27 species of hard ticks belonging to nine genera have been reported to date from Sri Lanka.

Endemic species are denoted as E.

Family: Ixodidae
Amblyomma clypeolatum
Amblyomma gervaisi
Amblyomma integrum 
Amblyomma javanense
Amblyomma testudinarium
Amblyomma trimaculatum
Amblyomma varanense
Dermacentor auratus
Ixodes petauristae
Ixodes ceylonensis
Haemaphysalis aculeata
Haemaphysalis anomala
Haemaphysalis bispinosa
Haemaphysalis cuspidata
Haemaphysalis hystricis
Haemaphysalis intermedia
Haemaphysalis kyasanurensis
Haemaphysalis leachi
Haemaphysalis minuta
Haemaphysalis spinigera
Haemaphysalis turturis
Hyalomma brevipunctata 
Hyalomma marginatum 
Nosomma monstrosum
Nuttalliella namaqua
Rhipicephalus annulatus 
Rhipicephalus microplus
Rhipicephalus haemaphysaloides
Rhipicephalus sanguineus

Soft ticks
The exact classification of soft ticks in Sri Lanka is not yet understood completely. Soft ticks are belongs to Argasidae.

Argas persicus
Ornithodoros savignyi
Otobius megnini

References